In Euclidean geometry, two objects are similar if they have the same shape, or if one has the same shape as the mirror image of the other. More precisely, one can be obtained from the other by uniformly scaling (enlarging or reducing), possibly with additional translation, rotation and reflection. This means that either object can be rescaled, repositioned, and reflected, so as to coincide precisely with the other object. If two objects are similar, each is congruent to the result of a particular uniform scaling of the other.

For example, all circles are similar to each other, all squares are similar to each other, and all equilateral triangles are similar to each other. On the other hand, ellipses are not all similar to each other, rectangles are not all similar to each other, and isosceles triangles are not all similar to each other. This is because two ellipses can have different width to height ratio, two rectangle can also have a different length to breadth ratio, and two isosceles triangle can have different base angles. 

If two angles of a triangle have measures equal to the measures of two angles of another triangle, then the triangles are similar. Corresponding sides of similar polygons are in proportion, and corresponding angles of similar polygons have the same measure.

Two congruent shapes are similar, with a scale factor of 1. However, some school textbooks specifically exclude congruent triangles from their definition of similar triangles by insisting that the sizes must be different if the triangles are to qualify as similar.

Similar triangles
It can be shown that two triangles having congruent angles (equiangular triangles) are similar, that is, the corresponding sides can be proved to be proportional. This is known as the AAA similarity theorem. Note that the "AAA" is a mnemonic: each one of the three A's refers to an "angle". Due to this theorem, several authors simplify the definition of similar triangles to only require that the corresponding three angles are congruent.

There are several criteria each of which is necessary and sufficient for two triangles to be similar:

Any two pairs of angles are congruent, which in Euclidean geometry implies that all three angles are congruent:

All the corresponding sides are proportional:

 . This is equivalent to saying that one triangle (or its mirror image) is an enlargement of the other.

Any two pairs of sides are proportional, and the angles included between these sides are congruent:
This is known as the SAS similarity criterion. The "SAS" is a mnemonic: each one of the two S's refers to a "side"; the A refers to an "angle" between the two sides.

There are several elementary results concerning similar triangles in Euclidean geometry:
 Any two equilateral triangles are similar.
 Two triangles, both similar to a third triangle, are similar to each other (transitivity of similarity of triangles).
 Corresponding altitudes of similar triangles have the same ratio as the corresponding sides.
 Two right triangles are similar if the hypotenuse and one other side have lengths in the same ratio. There are several equivalent conditions in this case, such as the right triangles having an acute angle of the same measure, or having the lengths of the legs (sides) being in the same proportion.

Given a triangle  and a line segment  one can, with a ruler and compass, find a point  such that . The statement that point  satisfying this condition exists is Wallis's postulate and is logically equivalent to Euclid's parallel postulate. In hyperbolic geometry (where Wallis's postulate is false) similar triangles are congruent.

In the axiomatic treatment of Euclidean geometry given by George David Birkhoff (see Birkhoff's axioms) the SAS similarity criterion given above was used to replace both Euclid's parallel postulate and the SAS axiom which enabled the dramatic shortening of Hilbert's axioms.

Similar triangles provide the basis for many synthetic (without the use of coordinates) proofs in Euclidean geometry. Among the elementary results that can be proved this way are: the angle bisector theorem, the geometric mean theorem, Ceva's theorem, Menelaus's theorem and the Pythagorean theorem. Similar triangles also provide the foundations for right triangle trigonometry.

Other similar polygons

The concept of similarity extends to polygons with more than three sides. Given any two similar polygons, corresponding sides taken in the same sequence (even if clockwise for one polygon and counterclockwise for the other) are proportional and corresponding angles taken in the same sequence are equal in measure. However, proportionality of corresponding sides is not by itself sufficient to prove similarity for polygons beyond triangles (otherwise, for example, all rhombi would be similar). Likewise, equality of all angles in sequence is not sufficient to guarantee similarity (otherwise all rectangles would be similar). A sufficient condition for similarity of polygons is that corresponding sides and diagonals are proportional.

For given n, all regular n-gons are similar.

Similar curves
Several types of curves have the property that all examples of that type are similar to each other. These include:
Lines (any two lines are even congruent)
Line segments
Circles
Parabolas
Hyperbolas of a specific eccentricity
Ellipses of a specific eccentricity
Catenaries
Graphs of the logarithm function for different bases
Graphs of the exponential function for different bases
Logarithmic spirals are self-similar

In Euclidean space
A similarity (also called a similarity transformation or similitude) of a Euclidean space is a bijection  from the space onto itself that multiplies all distances by the same positive real number , so that for any two points  and  we have

The scalar  has many names in the literature including; the ratio of similarity, the stretching factor and the similarity coefficient. When  = 1 a similarity is called an isometry (rigid transformation). Two sets are called similar if one is the image of the other under a similarity.

As a map , a similarity of ratio  takes the form

Similarities preserve planes, lines, perpendicularity, parallelism, midpoints, inequalities between distances and line segments. Similarities preserve angles but do not necessarily preserve orientation, direct similitudes preserve orientation and opposite similitudes change it.

The similarities of Euclidean space form a group under the operation of composition called the similarities group . The similarities group  is itself a subgroup of the affine group, so every similarity is an affine transformation.

One can view the Euclidean plane as the complex plane, that is, as a 2-dimensional space over the reals. When , these similarities are isometries.

Area ratio and volume ratio 

The ratio between the areas of similar figures is equal to the square of the ratio of corresponding lengths of those figures (for example, when the side of a square or the radius of a circle is multiplied by three, its area is multiplied by nine — i.e. by three squared). The altitudes of similar triangles are in the same ratio as corresponding sides. If a triangle has a side of length  and an altitude drawn to that side of length  then a similar triangle with corresponding side of length  will have an altitude drawn to that side of length . The area of the first triangle is, while the area of the similar triangle will be . Similar figures which can be decomposed into similar triangles will have areas related in the same way. The relationship holds for figures that are not rectifiable as well.

The ratio between the volumes of similar figures is equal to the cube of the ratio of corresponding lengths of those figures (for example, when the edge of a cube or the radius of a sphere is multiplied by three, its volume is multiplied by 27 — i.e. by three cubed).

Galileo's square–cube law concerns similar solids.

Similarity with a center

If a similarity has exactly one invariant point: a point that the similarity keeps unchanged, then this only point is called "center" of the similarity.

On the first image below the title, on the left, one or another similarity shrinks a regular polygon into a concentric one, the vertices of which are each on a side of the previous polygon. This rotational reduction is repeated, so the initial polygon is extended into an abyss of regular polygons. The center of the similarity is the common center of the successive polygons. A red segment joins a vertex of the initial polygon to its image under the similarity, followed by a red segment going to the following image of vertex, and so on to form a spiral. Actually we can see more than three direct similarities on this first image, because every regular polygon is invariant under certain direct similarities, more precisely certain rotations the center of which is the center of the polygon, and a composition of direct similarities is also a direct similarity. For example we see the image of the initial regular pentagon under a homothety of negative  which is a similarity of ±180° angle and a positive ratio 

For example point W is the image of F under the rotation, and point T is the image of W under the homothety, more briefly T  =  (W ) =  ( F )) = ( F ) =  ( F ), by naming  the previous rotation, homothety and similarity, with 

This direct similarity that transforms triangle EFA into triangle ATB can be decomposed into a rotation and a homothety of same center S in several manners. For example,  the last decomposition being only represented on the image. To get  we can also compose in any order a rotation  angle and a homothety 

With  and  if  is the reflection with respect to line (CW ), then  is the indirect similarity that transforms segment [BF ]  into segment [CT ], but transforms point E into B and point A into A itself. Square ACBT is the image of ABEF under similarity  Point A is the center of this similarity because any point K being invariant under it fulfills  only possible  otherwise written 

How to construct the center S of direct similarity   how to find point S center of a rotation of +135° angle that transforms ray [SE ) into ray [SA )? This is an inscribed angle problem plus a question of orientation. The set of points  is an arc of circle  that joins E and A, of which the two radius leading to E and A form a central angle  This set of points is the blue quarter of circle of center F inside square ABEF. In the same manner, point S is a member of the blue quarter of circle of center T inside square BCAT. So point S is the intersection point of these two quarters of circles.

In general metric spaces

In a general metric space , an exact similitude is a function  from the metric space  into itself that multiplies all distances by the same positive scalar , called  's contraction factor, so that for any two points  and  we have

Weaker versions of similarity would for instance have  be a bi-Lipschitz function and the scalar  a limit

This weaker version applies when the metric is an effective resistance on a topologically self-similar set.

]

These self-similar sets have a self-similar measure  with dimension  given by the formula

which is often (but not always) equal to the set's Hausdorff dimension and packing dimension.

Topology

In topology, a metric space can be constructed by defining a similarity instead of a distance. The similarity is a function such that its value is greater when two points are closer (contrary to the distance, which is a measure of dissimilarity: the closer the points, the lesser the distance).

The definition of the similarity can vary among authors, depending on which properties are desired. The basic common properties are
 Positive defined:

 Majored by the similarity of one element on itself (auto-similarity):

More properties can be invoked, such as reflectivity or finiteness. The upper value is often set at 1 (creating a possibility for a probabilistic interpretation of the similitude).

Note that, in the topological sense used here, a similarity is a kind of measure.

Self-similarity
Self-similarity means that a pattern is non-trivially similar to itself, e.g., the set  of numbers of the form  where  ranges over all integers. When this set is plotted on a logarithmic scale it has one-dimensional translational symmetry: adding or subtracting the logarithm of two to the logarithm of one of these numbers produces the logarithm of another of these numbers. In the given set of numbers themselves, this corresponds to a similarity transformation in which the numbers are multiplied or divided by two.

Psychology

The intuition for the notion of geometric similarity already appears in human children, as can be seen in their drawings.

See also
 Congruence (geometry)
 Hamming distance (string or sequence similarity)
 Helmert transformation
 Inversive geometry
 Jaccard index
 Proportionality
 Basic proportionality theorem
 Semantic similarity
 Similarity search
 Similarity (philosophy)
 Similarity space on numerical taxonomy
 Homoeoid (shell of concentric, similar ellipsoids)
 Solution of triangles

Notes

References

Further reading
 
 Coxeter, H. S. M. (1969) [1961]. "§5 Similarity in the Euclidean Plane". pp. 67–76. "§7 Isometry and Similarity in Euclidean Space". pp. 96–104. Introduction to Geometry. John Wiley & Sons.

External links

Animated demonstration of similar triangles

Geometry
Equivalence (mathematics)
Euclidean geometry
Triangle geometry